This is a list of heads of government of Algeria since the formation of the Provisional Government of the Algerian Republic (GPRA) in exile in Cairo, Egypt in 1958 during the Algerian War, through independence in 1962, to the present day.

A total of eighteen people have served as Prime Minister of Algeria (not counting two Presidents of the GPRA and two Acting Prime Ministers). Additionally, one person, Ahmed Ouyahia, has served on three non-consecutive occasions.

Key
Political parties

Other factions

Status

List

Timeline

See also
Algeria
List of French governors of Algeria
President of Algeria
List of heads of state of Algeria
Prime Minister of Algeria
Lists of Incumbents

External links
World Statesmen - Algeria

Government of Algeria
Algeria
Heads of government
Algeria

zh:阿尔及利亚总理